Agave datylio is a member of the Agavoideae subfamily and a succulent plant. It is native to Baja California Sur.

Description
Agave datylio grows in a leaf rosette of about  diameter. The leaves are initially green when young, becoming yellow to a golden brown with age. The  flowers are greenish yellow, up to 55 mm (2.2 inches) long.

Cultivation
Easy to garden, A. datylio prefers gentle slopes and open sunlight and propagates vegetatively, but can be propagated by seed.

References

datylio
Plants described in 1902
Flora of Baja California Sur